Kungatolli is a village in Belagavi district in Karnataka, India.

References

Villages in Belagavi district